Saipem S.p.A. (Società Anonima Italiana Perforazioni E Montaggi lit. Drilling and Assembly Italian Public Limited Company) is an Italian multinational oilfield services company and one of the largest in the world. Until 2016 it was a subsidiary of Italian oil and gas supermajor Eni, which retains approximately 30% of Saipem's shares.

History

Early history

The history of Saipem is deeply connected to Enrico Mattei's management era of Eni during the years of the Italian economic miracle. In the early 1950s Mattei had reorganized the Italian oil industry through a complex system of outright acquisitions and government investments, in order to guarantee Italy's self-reliance in energy.

At first, Mattei focused on natural gas, the only abundant source of energy available in mainland Italy, through Snam, a newly formed gas pipelines company. In the late 1950s, Eni's subsidiary Snam came to head two sub-holdings: Snam Montaggi, created in 1955 to build pipelines and drilling platforms, and Snam Progetti, created in 1956, specializing in tankers. In 1957 drilling company Saip, a subsidiary of Agip (Eni's fuel retailer), was merged with Snam Montaggi to create Saipem.

Saipem was a pioneer in offshore drilling and pipelines construction in Europe; in 1959 it started drilling oil off the coast of Gela, in Sicily and in the early 1960s initiated the Central European Line pipeline, running from the port of Genoa to West Germany, where Eni Deutschland subsidiary was building refineries in Ingolstadt. In addition, in 1961 Saipem built a 1,140 km long oil pipeline in India and a gas pipeline in Iraq.

1970s-1990s

In 1978, Saipem laid down Castoro Sei, a column stabilized semi-submersible pipelay vessel. In the same year Sapiem was commissioned the construction of IGAT-2 pipeline in Iran. About 80 per cent of the line had been completed by 1985, when the works had to be halted because of the Iran-Iraq war.

In 1983, Saipem completed the construction of the massive Trans-Mediterranean Pipeline, linking Algeria to Italy.

In 1988, a joint venture between Saipem and Brown & Root was formed, known as European Marine Contractors, that realized two major projects: Zeepipe, completed in 1993, a 1,416 km natural gas transportation system to transport North Sea natural gas to the receiving terminal at Zeebrugge in Belgium; and a 707 km trunkline connecting Hong Kong with Yancheng 13-1 gasfield, located in the Yinggehai Basin, completed in 1994.

In 199,1 Saipem started operating Saipem 7000, the world's second biggest crane vessel.

In 1996, the Maghreb–Europe Gas Pipeline linked Algerian gasfields to Spain.

In 1995-1999, Saipem was the main contractor for the construction of Europipe I and Europipe II natural gas pipelines, connecting Norway to Germany.

21st century

In the 21st century, Saipem carried on a number of acquisitions, culminating in the purchase of Bouygues Offshore for $1 billion in 2002. In 2006 Saipem merged with Snamprogetti, a subsidiary of Eni specializing in the design and execution of large scale offshore projects for the production and transportation of hydrocarbons. Through the merger, the new group strengthened its position in West Africa, Middle East, Central Asia, and South East Asia and acquired significant technological competence in gas monetization and heavy oil exploitation.

In 2001-2003, Saipem built the offshore section of Blue Stream, a major trans-Black Sea gas pipeline that carries natural gas from Russia into Turkey.

In 2003-2004, Saipem built the Greenstream pipeline, connecting Libya to Sicily.

In 2006, Saipem completed the sealines of the Dolphin Gas Project, connecting Qatar's North Field to the United Arab Emirates and Oman.

In 2006-2008, Saipem laid down Scarabeo 8 and Scarabeo 9 ultra deepwater 6th generation semi-submersible drilling rigs, completed in 2011–12.

In 2011, Saipem completed the two 1,220 km gas sealines of Nord Stream 1, a system of offshore natural gas pipelines from Russia to Germany and the longest in the world.

In 2013, Saipem was awarded a $3 billion contract for the development of the Egina oil field, located approximately 150 km off the coast of Nigeria in the Gulf of Guinea; the contract included engineering, procurement, fabrication, installation and pre-commissioning of 52 km of oil production and water injection flow lines, 12 flexible jumpers, 20 km of gas export pipelines, 80 km of umbilicals, and of the mooring and offloading systems.

On 8 February 2015, Saipem won a $1.8 billion contract to build two 95 km pipelines at the Kashagan field, linking the oil fields in the Caspian Sea to the mainland in Kazakhstan. In November of the same year Saipem completed the pipelay on the 890 km gas export offshore pipeline for the Inpex-led Ichthys LNG project in Australia, what is said was the longest subsea pipeline in the southern hemisphere and the third longest in the world.

In 2016, Eni sold a 12.5% stake in Saipem (retaining a 30% share though), that was acquired by CDP Equity, and subsequently allowed Saipem to scrap the old Eni logo and design its own, with the objective of creating a new, more autonomous company focusing on oilfield services.

In 2019, Saipem entered the airborne wind energy or energy kite systems industry via an agreement with KiteGen.

Controversies
In 2010, Saipem agreed to pay a penalty of US$30 million to settle a Nigerian investigation into a bribery case involving the construction of Nigeria LNG facilities. Saipem is also under trial in Italy over charges relating to the same case.

In September 2018, an Italian court found Saipem and former CEO Pietro Tali, guilty of corruption over bribes in Algeria. The former CEO was sentenced to four years and nine months in prison and 197.9 million euros were seized from the company.
In September 2018, an Italian court found Saipem and former CEO Pietro Tali, guilty of corruption over bribes in Algeria. The former CEO was sentenced to four years and nine months in prison and 197.9 million euros were seized from the company.[22]
In January 2020, after an appeal brought before the Milan Court of Appeal, the court finally acquitted Saipem and all managers involved.

Corporate affairs

Headquarters and offices

Saipem's headquarters are located in Milan, Via Luigi Russolo, 5 - Italy.

Saipem has offices in over 60 countries, including:
Far East and Oceania: Australia, China, India, Indonesia, Malaysia, Singapore, Thailand.
Europe: Italy, France, Belgium, Croatia, Germany, Great Britain, Ireland, Luxemburg, Norway, The Netherlands, Portugal, Spain, Switzerland, Turkey, Poland, Romania
America: Argentina, Brazil, Canada, Ecuador, Mexico, Peru, U.S.A., Venezuela, Suriname
CIS: Azerbaijan, Kazakhstan, Russia, Georgia
Africa: Algeria, Angola, Cameroon, Congo, Egypt, Gabon, Libya, Morocco, Nigeria, Sudan, Mozambique
Middle East: United Arab Emirates, Saudi Arabia, Iran, Oman, Qatar, Iraq, Kuwait

Subdidiaries

The group headed by Saipem S.p.A. includes approximately 90 companies and consortia, based all around the world.

 "Petromar’s" shares are divided 70% (Saipem) 30% (Sonangol) https://www.petromar.co.ao/about/

Board of directors
The current chairman of Siapem S.p.A. is Francesco Caio since 3 May 2018. Before his appointment as chairman, Caio was CEO of Poste Italiane. The current CEO of Saipem is Stefano Cao, since 30 April 2015. Cao has spent his entire professional career working for Saipem and Eni.

Main Shareholders 's
On the basis of the information available and the communications received pursuant to CONSOB Resolution 11971/1999 (Issuers Regulations), the shareholders holding shares totalling to more than 3% of the share capital of Saipem S.p.A. are:

Main Offshore Pipe-laying fleets at 31 December 2017

Main Drilling fleets at 31 December 2017 

Semi-submersible platform Scarabeo 5
Semi-submersible platform Scarabeo 6
Semi-submersible platform Scarabeo 7
Semi-submersible platform Scarabeo 8
Semi-submersible platform Scarabeo 9
Drillship Saipem 10000
Drillship Saipem 12000
Jack-up Perro Negro 2
Jack-up Perro Negro 3
Jack-up Perro Negro 4
Jack-up Perro Negro 5
Jack-up Perro Negro 7
Jack-up Perro Negro 8
Tender Assisted Drilling Barge

Main FPSO's at 31 December 2017 

Saipem Cidade de Vitoria
Saipem Gimboa
Saipem Kaombo (not owned)

See also 

List of Italian companies
List of oilfield service companies

References

Essential bibliography
 (en) Paul H. Frankel, Oil and Power Policy, New York – Washington, Praeger, 1966
 (en) Marcello Boldrini, Mattei, Rome, Colombo, 1969
 (it) Marcello Colitti, Energia e sviluppo in Italia, Bari, De Donato, 1979
 (it) Nico Perrone, Enrico Mattei, Bologna, Il mulino, 2001

External links

Eni
Energy engineering and contractor companies
Engineering companies of Italy
Energy companies established in 1957
Oil and gas companies of Italy
Companies based in Milan
Italian brands
Italian companies established in 1957